Bradley Roy Voyles (born December 30, 1976) is a former professional baseball pitcher who played for three seasons. He pitched in 40 games for the Kansas City Royals from 2001 to 2003.

Voyles attended Luxemburg-Casco High School in Luxemburg, Wisconsin. He did not pitch for the school's baseball team after his sophomore year because, according to Voyles, he had too little command of his pitches. He entered the workforce after high school and did not plan to attend college until he received a scholarship offer from a Kishwaukee College coach who had only heard of Voyles' performance at a baseball camp. After two years at Kishwaukee, he continued his college baseball career at Lincoln Memorial University. Despite posting an earned run average of 5.06 in 1998, he was selected in that year's Major League Baseball draft in the 45th round by the Atlanta Braves.

Voyles remained in the Braves organization until 2001. In spring training of that year, he broke his ankle and was kept off the field until June. At the trade deadline, with the Braves having lost Rafael Furcal and in need of a shortstop for their playoff push, Voyles was traded along with Alejandro Machado to the Kansas City Royals in exchange for Rey Sanchez. Voyles made his Major League debut later that season, allowing only a base on balls in a ninth-inning relief appearance against the Texas Rangers.

References

External links
, or Retrosheet, or Pelota Binaria

1976 births
Living people
American expatriate baseball players in Japan
American expatriate baseball players in Mexico
Baseball players from Wisconsin
Columbus Clippers players
Eugene Emeralds players
Fukuoka Daiei Hawks players
Gary SouthShore RailCats players
Greenville Braves players
Kansas City Royals players
Lincoln Memorial Railsplitters baseball players
Macon Braves players
Major League Baseball pitchers
Memphis Redbirds players
Myrtle Beach Pelicans players
Nippon Professional Baseball pitchers
Omaha Royals players
Pastora de los Llanos players
American expatriate baseball players in Venezuela
Pericos de Puebla players
Sportspeople from Green Bay, Wisconsin
Tigres de Quintana Roo players
Wichita Wranglers players
Kishwaukee Kougars baseball players